Gennaro Michael Nigro (born May 29, 2000) is an American soccer player who plays as a midfielder for MLS Next Pro club Real Monarchs.

Raised in Clark, New Jersey, Nigro played prep soccer for Arthur L. Johnson High School.

Career
In 2018, Nigro signed for Italian Serie A side Roma from the Players Development Academy in the United States. He had previously committed to Cornell University.

In 2020, he moved to Italian third division club Potenza.

References

External links
 

American soccer players
Living people
2000 births
Arthur L. Johnson High School alumni
Association football midfielders
American people of Italian descent
Soccer players from New Jersey
People from Clark, New Jersey
Potenza Calcio players
Serie C players
Sportspeople from Union County, New Jersey
American expatriate soccer players
Expatriate footballers in Italy
American expatriate sportspeople in Italy
Real Monarchs players
MLS Next Pro players